The  is a DC suburban electric multiple unit (EMU) train type operated by Central Japan Railway Company (JR Central) in Japan. First introduced in July 1989, a total of 15 four-car sets were built between 1989 and 1991 by Hitachi, Kawasaki Heavy Industries, and Kinki Sharyo to replace older 113 and 115 series EMUs. The design of the 311 series was developed from that of the 211 series.

Design
Built jointly by Hitachi, Kawasaki Heavy Industries, and Kinki Sharyo, the design was developed from the earlier 211 series, with the first five trains introduced from July 1989 to replace older 113 and 115 series EMUs. Eight more sets were introduced from the start of the new timetable in March 1990, and a further two sets were introduced in March 1991.

Formation
, the fleet consists of 15 four-car sets (G1 to G15), all based at Ogaki Depot. The trainsets are formed as shown below with two motored cars and two non-powered trailer cars.

The KuMoHa car is fitted with a single-arm pantograph. Between June 2006 and July 2008, all sets had their original lozenge pantographs replaced with single-arm pantographs.

Interior

References

External links

 JR Central 311 series information 

Central Japan Railway Company
Electric multiple units of Japan
Train-related introductions in 1989
Hitachi multiple units
Kawasaki multiple units
Kinki Sharyo multiple units
1500 V DC multiple units of Japan